Ringmaster is a 1998 American comedy film starring Jerry Springer as a fictional version of himself named Jerry Farrelly, host of a show similar to his own called Jerry.

Plot
There are three ongoing plots in the film.  The primary one surrounds a white trash, trailer park family in which the slutty Angel is sleeping with her mother's husband, prompting the mother to constantly try to outdo her promiscuous daughter's behavior out of spite, including sleeping with her daughter's boyfriend.

The secondary plot revolves around an urban black woman called Starletta whose boyfriend Demond is sleeping with her two best friends, but the three are united against Demond when he eyes up the trashy but sexy Angel. He spends the rest of the film trying to get into naughty Angel's knickers, while his jealous girlfriend Starletta is frantically trying to prevent Demond from enjoying the promiscuous blonde. Unfortunately for Starletta, horny Angel manages to sneak Demond into her hotel room where he wastes little time in getting her clothes off and into bed much to smug Angel's evident delight.
Starletta stalks the hotel corridors desperate to stop her bed-hopping boyfriend from humping the skanky teen but is unable to stop Demond and Angel's night of pleasure.

The third plot revolves around Jerry and the show itself, detailing the difficulty Jerry faces in trying to come to terms with his rather dubious claim to fame, and the staff's utter amazement at the bizarre stories they must deal with.

A minor sub-plot involves a producer on the show who mistakenly picks up one of the guests, a self-proclaimed "man-by-day-woman-by-night."

Cast
 Jerry Springer as Jerry Farrelly
 Jaime Pressly as Angel Zorzak
 William McNamara as Troy Davenport
 Molly Hagan as Connie Zorzak
 John Capodice as Mel Riley
 Wendy Raquel Robinson as Starletta
 Ashley Holbrook as Willie
 Tangie Ambrose as Vonda Simmons
 Nicki Micheaux as Leshawnette
 Michael Jai White as Demond
 Krista Tesreau as Catherine Winicott
 Dawn Maxey as Natalie
 Maximilliana as Charlie / Claire
 Michael Dudikoff as Rusty

Reception
The film had a generally negative reception, with Rotten Tomatoes giving it a 21% rating (with an average rating of 3.2 out of 10). The film won a Golden Raspberry Award for Worst New Star (Jerry Springer, tied with Joe Eszterhas for his small cameo in An Alan Smithee Film: Burn Hollywood Burn). The film was a box office bomb, grossing back less than half its budget.

Soundtrack

A soundtrack containing hip hop music was released on March 23, 1999 by Lil' Joe Records. It peaked at number 80 on the Top R&B/Hip-Hop Albums.

The film also features the single Talk Show Shh! by Shae Jones which peaked at number 88 on the Billboard Hot 100. A music video for the song was made to promote the film and featured Springer. However, the song was not included on the soundtrack album.

References

External links

Artisan Entertainment films
1998 films
1998 comedy films
1990s English-language films
Films about interracial romance
American comedy films
The Kushner-Locke Company films
Golden Raspberry Award winning films
Films about television
1990s American films